The N.R.M.A. Show, also known as The Open Road, is an early Australian television series which aired on Sydney station TCN-9 in 1957, from 30 June to 17 November. The series was promoted as "designed to provide the average car owner with hints and help to make the most out of motoring". Compered by Bruce Beeby, the series aired on Sundays at 5:30PM. Little information is available on this series.

References

External links

Nine Network original programming
1957 Australian television series debuts
1957 Australian television series endings
Australian non-fiction television series
Black-and-white Australian television shows
English-language television shows
Australian live television series